Mispilodes is a genus of longhorn beetles of the subfamily Lamiinae, containing the following species:

 Mispilodes andamanica Breuning, 1969
 Mispilodes borneensis Breuning, 1938
 Mispilodes grisescens Breuning, 1940

References

Pteropliini